Natu Gopal Narhar (1911–1991) was a Marathi poet, often referred to as Poet Manmohan.  One of his collections, Aditya, was published in 1971 by Continental Prakashan.

1911 births
1991 deaths
Marathi-language poets
20th-century Indian poets
Indian male poets
20th-century Indian male writers